, properly called , is training armour used primarily in the Japanese martial art of kendo, with variants used for jūkendō, tankendo, and naginata.

History
To further reduce injuries, practice armour based on traditional samurai armor was developed, with this practice armour being the basis for the modern .

Description and use
A set of  has four components:

 : combined face mask and shoulder protectors (helmet);
 : hand and forearm protectors (gauntlets);
 : torso protector (breastplate);
 : groin and leg protectors (faulds).

A fifth component,  (shin protectors, or greaves), are worn by naginatajutsu practitioners.

The  protects the face, neck, and shoulders. It consists of a facemask with several horizontal metal bars running the entire width of the face, from the chin to the top of the head. To this is attached a long rectangular thick cloth padding that curves over the top of the head and extends to cover the shoulders. A throat protector is attached to the bottom of the facemask. The  is held in place with a pair of woven cords that wrap around the head and are tied at the back.

The  are mitten-like gloves. They were designed expressly for kendo. In the past,  were often made with fully articulated fingers. This is rarely seen today as there can be a safety issue with snagged fingers. The target area is the wrist portion of each .

The modern form has a pronounced bulge to help direct the force of strikes away from the soft areas in the middle of the torso. Lacquered bamboo is traditionally used although lacquered paper 'fibre' (frequently misidentified as fiberglass) or moulded plastic are used for less expensive . The  is supported from the shoulders by two diagonal ties and is restrained at the small of the back with another set of ties. In the past, this was also a valid target for a thrust in Kendo.

The  is a thick cloth belt that wraps around the waist and ties under the front flap in front of the groin. Sturdy cloth covered flaps hang from the belt to protect the upper legs and groin. The flaps run along half of the belt's length, which should be positioned over the front half of the body.

See also

 Hogu – armour worn by taekwondo athletes during sparring

References

Japanese martial arts terminology
Kendo
Japanese martial arts equipment
Japanese armour
Samurai armour